The 2009 O'Byrne Cup was a Gaelic football competition played by the teams of Leinster GAA. The competition differs from the Leinster Senior Football Championship as it also features further education colleges and the winning team does not progress to another tournament at All-Ireland level. The winners of the 2009 O'Byrne Cup were Louth.

O'Byrne Cup

First round
The eight winning teams from the first round of the O'Byrne Cup go on to qualify for the quarter finals of the tournament. The losers of the first round go on to the O'Byrne Shield quarter finals.

Quarter-finals

Semi-finals

Final

O'Byrne Shield
The teams included in the quarter finals of the O'Byrne Shield were Offaly, Carlow, Wexford, Laois, Kilkenny, UCD, Athlone IT and Westmeath. Laois were the eventual winners in the final against Carlow.

See also
 2009 Dr McKenna Cup

References

2009
2009 in Gaelic football
January 2009 sports events in Europe